De'voreaux White (born Devorea W. Sefas; August 6, 1965) is an American actor. He is best known for his role in Die Hard as the young limousine driver, Argyle.

Career

Film and television
De'voreaux White was born in Los Angeles County, California. He began acting professionally at the age of 10.

His first bookings were The Jeffersons, Little House on the Prairie and 1980's The Blues Brothers, where he played the role of the youth who tries to steal a guitar from Ray Charles' music store. White also played one of the boys who attempt to keep the baseball in the Neil Simon movie Max Dugan Returns. In 1984, he played Wylie, who was lynched for accidentally shooting a white sheriff in Places in the Heart. The movie received notice at the Academy Awards and White credits the role for helping to provide the opportunity to do a reading with the producer Joel Silver and the actor Bruce Willis for Die Hard (1988). Some of the dialogue in the film he improvised on set with Willis. His filming schedule was spread over a three-month period.

White also starred in the television series Head of the Class as Aristotle McKenzie. In 1992, he played the role of Lucky in the movie Trespass, playing the drug-addicted little brother of King James (played by Ice-T). He appeared in the 2000 drama Shadow Hours.

White reprised his role as Argyle from Die Hard, with Willis, in a commercial for Advance Auto Parts' DieHard brand of car batteries in October 2020.

Other work
In 2019, White set up his own company in California. By then, he worked in the clinical staff of a substance-abuse rehabilitation facility.

Personal life
In 2019, White resided in Newport Beach, California. His original last name, Sefas, is Ethiopian; after his mother died, his maternal grandparents with the surname White adopted him.

Filmography

Television
 1977 The Jeffersons as Warren Barnes
 1979–1981 Little House on the Prairie as various characters
 1981 Quincy, M.E. as Ethan Kellogg
 1982 T.J. Hooker as Stevie Pine
 1983–1984 Diff'rent Strokes as Glenn
 1985 Highway to Heaven as Terry
 1986 227 as Harvey
 1989 In the Heat of the Night as Albert Tolliver
 1989–1991 Head of the Class as Aristotle McKenzie
 2014 Workaholics as Uber Driver
 2023 Easter as Smiley

Films
 1980 The Blues Brothers as Young Guitar Thief
 1983 Max Dugan Returns as Boy
 1984 Places in the Heart as Wylie
 1988 Action Jackson as Clovis
 1988 Die Hard as Argyle
 1988 Split Decisions as Coop
 1992 Trespass as "Lucky"
 2000 Shadow Hours as Second Transvestite
 2012 Sandbar'' as Charles Kendall

References

External links

Living people
African-American male actors
Male actors from Los Angeles
American male television actors
American male film actors
1965 births
21st-century African-American people
20th-century African-American people